Kimizuka (written: 君塚) is a Japanese surname. Notable people with the surname include:

, Japanese general
, Japanese screenwriter and director

Japanese-language surnames